Lorenzo Colli (born 26 February 1997) is an Italian football player who currently plays for Virtus Castelfranco.

Club career
He made his Serie C debut for Casertana on 18 September 2016 in a game against Lecce.

In September 2019, it was confirmed that Colli had joined Virtus Castelfranco.

References

External links
 

1997 births
Footballers from Bologna
Living people
Italian footballers
Bologna F.C. 1909 players
Casertana F.C. players
A.C. Prato players
Serie C players
Association football midfielders